The 2019 New Zealand Grand Prix event for open wheel racing cars was held at Manfeild: Circuit Chris Amon near Feilding on 10 February 2019. It was the sixty-fourth New Zealand Grand Prix and fielded Toyota Racing Series cars. The event also served as the third race of the fifth round of the 2019 Toyota Racing Series, the final race of the series.

Report

Qualifying

Race 

Notes
1. – Armstrong was given a five-second time penalty for forcing another driver (Lawson) off the road.
2. – Muth was given a five-second time penalty for 'breach of driving conduct'.

References

New Zealand Grand Prix
New Zealand Grand Prix
New Zealand Grand Prix